The British Basketball League Most Valuable Player award is an annual award of the United Kingdom's top professional basketball league, the British Basketball League. It is awarded to the league's top performing player throughout the duration of the season. The award is decided by a panel consisting of each of the League's team's head coaches who submit one vote each at the end of the regular season, and the player with the most votes is presented with the award. Only on one occasion - the 2006–2007 season - has the award been shared between two players (Jeff Bonds and Brian Dux) due to a tie in the voting. Six players - Alton Byrd, Tony Dorsey, Trey Moore and Andrew Sullivan, Rahmon Fletcher, Justin Robinson - have won the award twice, whilst only three British-born players have won the award, namely Roger Huggins, Andrew Sullivan, and Justin Robinson.

Winners

References

External links
BBl.org.uk
MikeShaft.com

British Basketball League
Basketball most valuable player awards
European basketball awards